Last Hurrah for Chivalry is a 1979 Hong Kong martial arts film written and directed by John Woo, who also producer with Raymond Chow. The film stars Damian Lau and Wei Pai. The film is a precursor to Woo's heroic bloodshed films. The film was released on 11 November 1979.

Plot
Last Hurrah for Chivalry is a story about two killers for hire in ancient China. The two assassins are master swordsmen with no allegiance. They decide to help out a local merchant, seeking revenge against a kung fu master. The plot contains multiple twists of deception, leaving characters wondering who to really trust. The story ultimately ends with a revelation as to who truly has honor.

Cast
Damian Lau as Tsing Yi
Wai Pak as Chang San / Cheung Sam
Bonnie Ngai as Sau Sau (The courtesan)
Lau Kong as Kao Pang / Ko Peng
Hoi Sang Lee as Pak Chung Tong
Fung Hak-on as Pray / Let It Be
Chin Yuet-sang as Sleeping Wizard
Cheng Lui as Chen Guan Wu
Wang Kuang-yu as Wang
Alan Chui Chung-San as oriental fighter / bodyguard
Mars as Pak Chung Tong's man

Production
The film is a tribute to director John Woo's mentor, Chang Cheh. The stylish appeal also came from Akira Kurosawa influences. The main character Tsing Yi is an inspiration taken from the real-life assassin Jing Ke, who is historically remembered for his failed assassination attempt of Qin Shi Huang. The year the film was released is also the same year John Woo met Tsui Hark.

Box office
Last Hurrah for Chivalry had mediocre box office numbers.

References

External links

1979 films
1979 martial arts films
1970s Cantonese-language films
1970s Hong Kong films
Films directed by John Woo
Golden Harvest films
Hong Kong martial arts films
Kung fu films
Wuxia films